HMS Mariner was a reciprocating engine-powered  during the Second World War. Laid down as HMCS Kincardine for the Royal Canadian Navy she was transferred on completion to the Royal Navy as HMS Mariner. She survived the war and was sold to Myanmar in 1958 as Yang Myo Aung.

Design and description
The ships' complement consisted of 85 officers and ratings.

The reciprocating ships had two vertical triple-expansion steam engines, each driving one shaft, using steam provided by two Admiralty three-drum boilers.

The Algerine class was armed with a QF  Mk V anti-aircraft gun and four twin-gun mounts for Oerlikon 20 mm cannon. The latter guns were in short supply when the first ships were being completed and they often got a proportion of single mounts. By 1944, single-barrel Bofors 40 mm mounts began replacing the twin 20 mm mounts on a one for one basis. All of the ships were fitted for four throwers and two rails for depth charges.

Construction and career
The ship was put on order as HMCS Kincardine by the Royal Canadian Navy in July 1942 at the Port Arthur Shipbuilding Company at Port Arthur, Ontario, Canada. She was laid down on 26 August 1942 and launched on 9 May 1944. On completion she was transferred to the Royal Navy as part of an exchange for an equal number of s. She was commissioned as HMS Mariner on 23 May 1944. In 1954 Mariner was on patrol in the North Sea as a fishery protection vessel, checking trawlers nets, and giving aid to any of the trawlers should they need it.

She was sold to the Burmese Navy and was reactivated at HM Dockyard Sheerness. She was handed over to Burma in the pools of London on 18 April 1958 and renamed Yang Myo Aung. She was fitted as a minelayer, carrying eight mines in each side.

She served in the Burmese Navy until 1982.

References

Bibliography
 
 
 Peter Elliott (1977) Allied Escort Ships of World War II. MacDonald & Janes,

External links
 HMS Mariner at uboat.net
 HMS Mariner at battleships-cruisers.co.uk

 

Algerine-class minesweepers of the Royal Navy
Ships built in Ontario
1944 ships
World War II minesweepers of the United Kingdom
Ships of the Fishery Protection Squadron of the United Kingdom
Ships of the Myanmar Navy